The 2011 Categoría Primera B season is the 22nd season since its founding and is officially called the 2011 Torneo Postobón for sponsorship reasons.

Teams

Torneo Apertura

First phase

Standings

Results

Knockout phase

Torneo Finalización

First stage

Standings

Results

Knockout stage

Bracket

Finals

Promotion/relegation playoff 
As the second worst team in the relegation table, América had to play a two-legged tie against Patriotas, the 2011 Categoría Primera B runner-up. As the Primera A team, América will play the second leg at home. The winner will be determined by points, followed by goal difference, then a penalty shootout. The winner will be promoted/remain in the Primera A for the 2012 season, while the loser will be relegated/remain in the Primera B.

Aggregate table

References 

Categoría Primera B seasons
2011 in Colombian football
Colombia